Vern Poore is an American sound engineer. He won an Academy Award for Best Sound and has been nominated for four more in the same category. He worked on over 60 films between 1975 and 1996.

Selected filmography
Poore won an Academy Award for Best Sound and has been nominated for another four:

Won
 Bird (1988)

Nominated
 Ladyhawke (1985)
 Heartbreak Ridge (1986)
 Lethal Weapon (1987)
 Unforgiven (1992)

References

External links

Year of birth missing (living people)
Living people
American audio engineers
Best Sound Mixing Academy Award winners